The 1892 United States presidential election in Alabama took place on November 8, 1892. All contemporary 44 states were part of the 1892 United States presidential election. Alabama voters chose eleven electors to the Electoral College, which selected the president and vice president.

Alabama was won by the Democratic nominees, former President Grover Cleveland of New York and his running mate Adlai Stevenson I of Illinois. However, Weaver performed well in the South as he won counties in Alabama, Georgia, Mississippi, North Carolina, and Texas. Populists did best in Alabama, where electoral chicanery probably carried the day for the Democrats.

Results

Results by county

See also
United States presidential elections in Alabama

Notes

References

Alabama
1892
1892 Alabama elections